The following is a list of Mexican composers of classical music.

17th–18th century
Juan de Lienas (c. 1640)
Francisco López Capillas (c. 1615 – 1673)
Juan García de Zéspedes (c. 1619–1678)
Manuel de Sumaya (1678–1755)
José María Bustamante (1777–1861)
José Mariano Elízaga (1786–1842)

First half of the 19th century
Cenobio Paniagua (1821–1882)
Aniceto Ortega (1825–1875)
Macedonio Alcalá (1831–1869)
Melesio Morales (1839–1908)

Second half of the 19th century
Felipe Villanueva (1862–1893)
Gustavo Campa (1863-1934)
Ricardo Castro (1864–1907)
Juventino Rosas (1868–1894)
Miguel Lerdo de Tejada (1869–1941)
Alfredo Carrasco (1875-1945)
Julián Carrillo Trujillo (1875–1965)
Manuel María Ponce (1882–1948)
Candelario Huízar (1883–1970)

First half of the 20th century

Carlos Chávez (1899–1978)
Silvestre Revueltas (1899–1940)
Eduardo Hernández Moncada (1899–1995)
Alfonso de Elias (1902-1984)
Luis Sandi (1905–1996)
Higinio Ruvalcaba (1905-1976)
Daniel Ayala Pérez (1906–1975)
Miguel Bernal Jiménez (1910–1956)
Blas Galindo (1910–1943)
Salvador Contreras (1910–1982)
José Pablo Moncayo (1912–1958)
Mario Ruiz Armengol (1914–2001)
Luis Herrera de la Fuente (1916-2014)
Carlos Jiménez Mabarak (1916–1994)
Manuel Enríquez (1926–1994)
Gloria Tapia (1927-2008)
Joaquín Gutiérrez Heras (1927-2012)
Francisco Savín (1929-2017)
Rosa Guraieb (1931-2014)
Eduardo Mata (1942–1995)

Second half of the 20th century
Julio Estrada (born 1943)
Mario Lavista (1943-2021)
Graciela Agudelo (1945–2018)
Daniel Catán (1949–2011)
Arturo Marquez (1950)
Marcela Rodríguez (1951)
Eduardo Diazmuñoz (1953)
Javier Álvarez (1956)
Guillermo Galindo (1960)
Hilda Paredes (born 1957)
Victor Rasgado (born 1959)
Ana Lara (1959)
Víctor Rasgado (1959)
Ricardo Zohn-Muldoon (born 1962)
Carlos Sánchez-Gutierrez (1964)
Armando Luna Ponce (1964-2015)
Mariana Villanueva (1964)
Gabriela Ortiz (1964)
Juan Trigos (1965)
Javier Torres Maldonado (1968)
Enrico Chapela (1974)

Mexican classical composers
Mexican